Voorburg 't Loo is the RandstadRail station of Voorburg, the Netherlands.

History
The station opened, as a railway station, in 1974 as part of the Hofpleinlijn (Den Haag - Rotterdam Hofplein). From 20 May 1977 the station was also served by services from Den Haag operating on the Zoetermeerlijn, operating Zoetermeer Stadslijn services. The railway station closed on 3 June 2006 and reopened as a RandstadRail station on 29 October 2006 for the HTM tram services (3 & 4) and on 11 November 2006 for the RET metro service (line E).

The station features 2 platforms on either side of a viaduct. These have a high and a low platform, with RandstadRail 3 and RandstadRail 4 using the lower platforms, and line E using the higher platforms.

Train services
The following services currently call at Voorburg 't Loo:

Tram and bus services
These services depart from street level, with the tram running on the grass section between the road.

 R-net Tram 2 (Dillenburgsingel - Leidsenhage - Voorburg 't Loo - Station Laan van NOI - Centraal Station - Grote Markt - Medisch Centrum Haaglanden - Loosduinen - Krayensteinweg)
 Bus 46 (Prinsenhof - Leidschendam - Voorburg 't Loo - Station Voorburg)

Railway stations opened in 1974
RandstadRail stations
Leidschendam-Voorburg